Pleochaeta is a genus of fungi in the family Erysiphaceae.

Species
Pleochaeta indica
Pleochaeta lynckii
Pleochaeta mali
Pleochaeta polychaeta
Pleochaeta populicola
Pleochaeta prosopidis
Pleochaeta salicicola
Pleochaeta shiraiana

References

Leotiomycetes
Fungal plant pathogens and diseases